Ivey P. Crutchfield (1878-1952) was an American architect and builder who worked in Georgia and Florida.  Several of his works are listed on the National Register of Historic Places for their architecture.

He was born in Wilkinson County, Georgia.  He was a regional architect-builder with many works in Vidalia, Georgia and with several residential works throughout Toombs County, Georgia.  He learned the building trade apparently on his own and did not have formal architect training, but he felt qualified by 1916 to post signage that he was one.  He died in Fort Myers, Florida in 1952.

A 1996 National Register nomination noted that "Crutchfield's buildings are easily recognizable for his use of fine Neoclassical detailing and marble, and their grand scale compared to surrounding buildings."

Works include (with attribution):
Robert and Missouri Garbutt House, 700 W. Liberty St., Lyons, Georgia (Crutchfield, Ivey P.), NRHP-listed, known also as "Twenty Columns"
Leader-Rosansky House, 403 Jackson St., Vidalia, Georgia (Crutchfield, Ivey P.), NRHP-listed
Leesburg High School, 100 Starkville Ave., Leesburg, Georgia (Crutchfield, Ivey P.), NRHP-listed.  He was the builder;  it was designed by other architects.
Peterson-Wilbanks House (1916), 404 Jackson St., Vidalia, Georgia (Crutchfield, Ivey P.), NRHP-listed
Treutlen County Courthouse, Courthouse Sq., Soperton, Georgia (Crutchfield,I.P.), NRHP-listed
Catoosa County Courthouse, 7694 Nashville St., Ringgold, Georgia (Crutchfield and Law), NRHP-listed
Several works in Vidalia Commercial Historic District, roughly bounded by Meadows, Jackson, Pine, and Thompson Sts. Vidalia, Georgia (Crutchfield, Ivey P.), NRHP-listed, including:
Ladson Library, Vidalia
Vidalia City Hall (c.1914), the former city hall, at Church and Meadows streets in Vidalia
First National Bank of Vidalia (1910), a two-story Neoclassical brick building with marble cornices, pilasters, belt courses and keystones.
Crawford W. Brazell House, Vidalia, NRHP-listed, in 1997 the Altama Museum of Art and History
Crescent City Barber Shop, Vidalia
New Vidalia Cafe, Vidalia
Leader and Rosansky's Store, Vidalia, in 1997 the Estroffs Department Store
The Vidalia Furniture Company, Vidalia (demolished)
Meadows Buggy Company, Vidalia (demolished)
the Vidalia College Institute annex, Vidalia (demolished).
old Mt. Vernon Bank, in 1997 the Cash Finance Company, in Mt. Vernon
Bank of Uvalda, in Uvalda
Farmers and Merchants Bank, Nunez
Soperton Bank, in 1997 the Soperton News, Soperton

References

Architects from Georgia (U.S. state)
1878 births
1952 deaths